The 2022 FIBA U16 Women's European Championship Division C was the 16th edition of the Division C of the FIBA U16 Women's European Championship, the third tier of the European women's under-16 basketball championship. It was played from 12 to 17 July 2022 in Korçë, Albania. Cyprus women's national under-16 basketball team won the tournament

Participating teams
  (23rd place, 2019 FIBA U16 Women's European Championship Division B)

First round
The draw of the first round was held on 15 February 2022 in Freising, Germany.

In the first round, the teams were drawn into two groups of three. All teams advance to the playoffs. The winners of both groups advance directly to the semifinals; the other teams will play the quarterfinals.

Group A

Group B

Playoffs

Quarterfinals

Semifinals

5th place match

3rd place match

Final

Final standings

References

2022
2022–23 in European women's basketball
FIBA U16
FIBA